2541 is the first solo EP by Grant Hart, formerly of the band Hüsker Dü. It was his first solo release after the break-up of Hüsker Dü in January 1988 and was released as a 3-inch mini CD single and as a 12-inch, 45 rpm vinyl single.

"2541" and "Come, Come" were re-recorded for the album Intolerance (1989).

The name was inspired by 2541 Nicollet Avenue in Minneapolis, the headquarters of influential independent record label Twin/Tone Records. For a time, Hüsker Dü had an office space next door to Twin/Tone at 2539. Marshall Crenshaw, who later covered "2541" for his 1996 album Miracle of Science, said of the song, "I know that it was real personal to [Hart] when he wrote it, but there's something universal about it."

Critical reception
Ira Robbins, in Trouser Press, called the title track "a touchingly sad acoustic folk-rock number with a typically catchy melody." The Encyclopedia of Popular Music wrote that Grant's "anger at the ending of Hüsker Dü ... was eloquently mounted on the back of a downbeat, acoustic number."

Track listing
All songs written by Grant Hart.

Personnel
 Grant Hart – vocals, instruments, production
 Tom Herbers – engineering 
 Ruben Hernandez Hernandez  – backing vocals on “Let Go”
 Tom Piotrowski – backing vocals on “Let Go”
 Steve Snow – backing vocals on “Let Go”

Notes

1988 EPs
Grant Hart albums
SST Records EPs